Aitern is a small municipality in the south-western German Federal State of Baden-Württemberg, part of the district Lörrach. Its coat of arms was granted in 1907. The blazon is Argent a Bend wavy Azure between two Rock Hammers Azure handled Sable. The wavy bend in the arms is allusive to the towns name, as it is derived from the Celtic word aitara which means flowing.

References

Lörrach (district)
Baden